Mr Drew's School for Boys is a British television programme which aired on Channel 4 from April until May 2014. The programme follows "Mr Drew" (Stephen Drew), who previously featured in another Channel 4 documentary, Educating Essex during his tenure as Deputy Headteacher at Passmores Academy. In the series, Mr Drew is the Headteacher of a summer school in Essex for boys who are challenging and have behavioural issues, with most of them being excluded from their schools. All boys in the programme are under the age of 12, with Max Carr being the youngest, at 8 years old during his appearance in the programme.

The series premiered on 29 April 2014, with the first episode attracting a viewing audience of 1.7 million.

Background

The programme features eleven boys from around the United Kingdom who have challenging behaviour and have been excluded from school. In an attempt to improve their behaviour, the eleven boys have enrolled in a summer school programme, lead by Mr Drew and a small team of teachers and pastoral support staff. The boys' parents also feature in the programme, with their parents receiving lessons and guidance on effective parental techniques and support which will hopefully improve their sons behaviour.

The synopsis for the programme was inspired by UK Government statistics released at the time which revealed that boys aged 12 and under are almost six times more likely than girls to be excluded from school.

Cast

Summer school staff

 Stephen Drew; "Mr Drew": The headteacher of the summer school. Previously featured in Educating Essex as one of the schools Deputy Headteachers (2011) 
 Dominic Volante: Teacher of PE 
 Mark Grist: Teacher of English & Drama
 Lindsey Skinner: Teacher of Mathematics 
 Benjamin Vidler: Teacher of Science

Boys

 Tom Roberts, 11 years old 
 Max Carr, 8 years old 
 Clark, 11 years old
 Max R, 11 years old
 Dominic, 10 years old 
 Aston & Dillon, 12 years old 
 Zane, 9 years old
 Joe & Jake, 9 years old 
 Spencer, age unknown

Narrator

 Nick Frost; 4 episodes

Series

Series 1 (2014)

Reception

Catriona Wightman from the Digital Spy praised the series for its ability to "not paint these boys out to be absolute terrors", but also highlighted the "impossible task" that Mr Drew or Channel 4 had set for him, recognising the challenges of the boys' behaviour in the series.

Pat Thomson, Professor of Education at the University of Nottingham criticised the programme, claiming that the majority of boys from working families who may display challenging behaviour would not be able to afford fees associated with a summer school programme similar to what was featured in the programme.

The Metro gave the series favourable reviews, claiming that "Mr Drew had been missed" since his last appearance on television in Educating Essex.

Controversies

Many viewers commented on the lack of parenting that the boys featured in the programme received, with lack of attention, poor diet and lack of sleep routine being highlighted by viewers as contributing factors as to why the boys featured may display challenging behaviour.

In Episode 2, Max, with PE Teacher Dominic Volante and his mum, Ruth, are walking into a local Co-op Food store to do some shopping whilst Max is seen wearing a tiger onesie with no shoes on. This gained attention on Twitter, with some taking to the platform to raise concerns regarding Ruth's choice of clothing for her son and the fact he was walking outside without shoes.

Throughout the four episodes, concerns were raised by viewers regarding some of the behaviours displayed by the boys, such as attention seeking and thumb sucking. Despite the ages of the boys, between 8–12 years old, many found it "interesting" that boys of that age would still feel the need to suck their thumbs, something mostly associated with babies and young children, whilst some had claimed that by sucking their thumb, it was their way of "crying for help".

Legacy

Since the original airing of the programme, there has been some calls for a return programme focusing on the boys currently and how (or if) there behaviour has changed.

One boy who featured in the show, Tom Roberts, aged 19 in 2021, admitted that his behaviour "was terrible" and since the programme had avoided jail time. He has embarked on working with other young people to advocate for positive destinations and positive behaviour.

See also

 Education in the United Kingdom
 Behaviour management

References

2014 in television
2014 in the United Kingdom
2010s British documentary television series
Channel 4 documentary series
English-language television shows
British high school television series
Television series about educators
Television series about teenagers